Celeste Hung Cee Kay (jyutping: hung4 si1 kei4; born 2 March 1972) is a Hong Kong butterfly and freestyle swimmer. She competed in five events at the 1988 Summer Olympics.

Hung trained at the Mantas Swimming Club along with Fenella Ng. In swimming at the 1986 Asian Games, she won bronze in the women's 4 × 100 m freestyle relay with Ng, Fu Mui, and Lee Sau-mei. She later became an executive director of Hop Hing, a Hong Kong restaurant operator.

References

External links
 
Picture of Hung and teammates at the 1986 Asian Games (scroll down to #10)

1972 births
Living people
Hong Kong female butterfly swimmers
Hong Kong female freestyle swimmers
Asian Games medalists in swimming
Swimmers at the 1986 Asian Games
Swimmers at the 1990 Asian Games
Medalists at the 1986 Asian Games
Asian Games bronze medalists for Hong Kong
Olympic swimmers of Hong Kong
Swimmers at the 1988 Summer Olympics
Place of birth missing (living people)